Winnipeg RT is a bus rapid transit system of Winnipeg Transit in Winnipeg, Manitoba, Canada, currently consisting of the Southwest Transitway. Future expansions are in the planning stages, consisting of an Eastern Corridor connecting downtown to Transcona and a West-North Corridor connecting St. James with Downtown and West Kildonan.

History 
The timeline of accomplishing some form of rapid transit in the Winnipeg area goes back to the late 1950s, when the Greater Winnipeg Transit Commission hired an urban planner from Toronto to design a subway for Winnipeg. 

The Future Development of the Greater Winnipeg Transit System recommended a 3 semi-circular lines intersecting at various points in the metro area. Combined, these three rapid transit lines would have cost $449 million. 

During the 1960s when the Greater Winnipeg Development Plan was being written, the Metropolitan Corporation of Greater Winnipeg studied a future transit system for the region. In their report, Winnipeg Area Transportation Study: Projections &  Recommendations (Vol. 3), a 5.4-mile (8.69 km) underground subway system between Polo Park Shopping Centre and Henderson and Hespeler Avenue in Elmwood was recommended. The WATS study did computerized modelling for a bus only transit system, but found it woefully inadequate for a metro population of 781,000 in 1991.The transit system visualized in this scheme would involve the introduction of 36 different transit routes totalling 622 route miles and requiring a fleet of 1,090 buses. Such an operation would ensure that, on the average, in the peak hours, buses in the metropolitan area would be spaced at 3.38 minute intervals along their routes. This compares with 6.43 minutes under the system in operation in 1962.In 1972, Mayor of Winnipeg Steve Juba advocated for a suspended monorail operating along Portage Avenue and later St. Vital. Juba said that it would be cheaper to construct than a subway. Cost estimates were $22 million for the completed project, or $1 million per mile. At the  time, the only monorail operating in North America was the Seattle monorail. While Juba was away, City Council held a vote on the monorail, which was lost. 

After the amalgamation of Winnipeg with its suburbs in 1972 and the creation of Winnipeg Transit, the newly-created transit department completely changed its view on rapid transit, opting for Bus Rapid Transit (BRT) instead, and changing where it should initially go to between downtown Winnipeg and the Fort Garry campus of the University of Manitoba. Deleuuw Dillon was hired to create a plan for bus rapid transit, now the Southwest Transit Corridor. However, politicians balked at the cost of any form of rapid transit—rail or bus, due to the very high initial construction costs. Dillon Consulting remains involved in planning for the SWBRT.

In 2002, Mayor Glen Murray pushed for BRT as the mode choice for the Southwest Transit Corridor using guided bus technology like that in the Essen, Germany. He made a deal with Premier Gary Doer that would see the construction of the Kenaston Underpass, the construction of the Manitoba Hydro headquarters downtown, and the construction of Phase I of the Corridor. All projects except the BRT were funded and constructed. Murray quit his job as Mayor to run for a seat in the 2004 Federal election, which he lost. 

The next Mayor, Sam Katz, promised to cancel a $43-million federal grant for the Southwest Transit Corridor and use that for improving recreation centres. At the same day of the 29 September 2004 vote on rapid transit, 25-year (1979–2004) veteran Transit Director Rick Borland quit the position and retired over the issue when one of Katz's advisors, Bryan Gray, criticized a report by Winnipeg Transit used to request funding for the busway.

In November 2004, Katz visited Ottawa and rode the O-Train (now the Trillium Line). Katz commented "And it's new, it's innovative -- it's the 21st century. There's no reason in my mind that we shouldn't explore this."

Instead, Katz formed an ad hoc group, chaired by Councillor Wyatt (Transcona), in the same ward that New Flyer has its manufacturing plant, to complete a study on the viability of LRT for Winnipeg, though Katz could not accomplish an LRT for Winnipeg. The Rapid Transit Task Force report was released in 2005.

Columnist Tom Brodbeck wrote in a September 2004 Winnipeg Sun article that there had been no cost-benefit analysis of the BRT project. 

As a compromise, Katz allowed Phase I of BRT that "could be converted to LRT at a later date." Papers were signed in September 2008, with construction beginning during the Summer of 2009.

On April 8th 2012, Phase 1 of the Southwest Transitway opened.

On April 12th 2020, Phase 2 of the Southwest Transitway opened.

Southwest Transitway

Phase 1 
Phase 1 of the Southwest Transitway commenced operation on 8 April 2012. The first section runs parallel to the railway tracks in a southwest direction from Queen Elizabeth Way (near The Forks) to Pembina Highway at Jubilee Avenue. Bus rapid transit services through the downtown Winnipeg area will use the Graham Avenue Transit Mall and other bus priority routes.

Jubilee Station was the last one to be constructed and was completed on June 21, 2015. It had a construction budget of C$3.9 million, with costs shared between the City (43%) and developer Gem Equities (57%). Due to cost overruns, Jubilee Station's actual cost was C$8.8 million after construction. The City owed more than C$1.3 million back to Gem to equalize the shared costs.

Funding was approved for the planned extension of the transitway south from the Jubilee interchange to Bison Drive and the University of Manitoba. A funding announcement was made in February 2015, construction began in late 2016, project completion in Fall of 2019. Driver testing commenced in the Fall of 2019. Service to begin (tentatively) 8 April 2020.

By 2018, although Winnipeg Transit has done its best to mitigate pigeon droppings at Osborne Station, it continues to be a problem at that location. Winnipeg Transit sought advice from Orkin Canada who recommended using OvoControl P in nearby bird feeders to control the pigeon population.

Phase 2

Phase 2 of the Southwest Transitway commenced operation on 12 April 2020. Phase 2 of the project saw the Transitway extended from the Jubilee Overpass, through the Parker Lands and the Manitoba Hydro ROW before joining the CNR Lettelier line north of Bishop Grandin Boulevard. The Transitway then goes through Waverley Heights to Markham Road, where BLUE buses continue to the University of Manitoba or to St. Norbert

In March 2019, Winnipeg Transit introduced a new route structure, which begun at the opening of Phase 2 (12 April 2020). Previously, the SWBRT operated as an "Open Busway" design. The new routing is "Spine & Feeder" which is similar in functionality to rail-transit lines. Switching to "Spine & Feeder" meant that WT has significantly changed its ideology since 1973, when it began promoting BRT, as the "Open Busway" ensured a "one-seat ride" and "spine & feeder may require a transfer to and from a feeder bus in the Fort Garry, Fort Richmond, and St. Norbert communities. The advantage of the spine & feeder design is there will be fewer buses entering the downtown area, being delayed by traffic congestion on downtown streets and along the Graham Avenue Transit Mall and as a result there will be less wear and tear on affected roadways.

Parker Station has been put on hold, pending legal settlements. It will be part of a future single-family and multi-family neighbourhood, Fulton Grove, situated within the Parker lands planning area. The station will be located between the existing Jubilee and Beaumont stations.

Financing Phase 2's estimated $590-million cost will be split three ways: $225m provincially, $140m federally, and $225m municipally. Of the City's share, $19.7-million will have to be budgeted annually for the project, starting in 2020. Raising the revenue to pay their fair share, one or a combination of "the allocation of cash-to-capital funding, a property tax increase, a transit fare increase, or a combination of these options," according to the Dillon report of 2014.

Stations

Routes

Eastern Transitway
The eastern corridor is a planned bus rapid transit line from downtown Winnipeg to Transcona.

Alignment Options
St. Boniface Option — the line would cross the Red River near Shaw Park and go through North St. Boniface and Whittier Park, crossing Archibald Street and going through the Mission Industrial Park terminating near Kildonan Place Shopping Centre.

Point Douglas Option — the line would see improvements to Higgins Avenue and a transit only bridge crossing the Red River, going through the Mission Industrial Park terminating near Kildonan Place.

Further public consultations on routing options will take place in October 2019, as no firm decisions have been made. However, since then further planning and decision-making on the Eastern Corridor has been put on hold, commensurate with the release of the Final Draft of the Transit Master Plan, expected Winter 2020.

North-West Transitway
The north-west corridor is a proposed bus rapid transit line that would use either the median or curb lanes along Portage Avenue from Polo Park to downtown, continuing on Main Street all the way to Inkster Boulevard in West Kildonan.

The airport link is a proposed bus rapid transit link connecting Winnipeg James Armstrong Richardson International Airport to the North-West Corridor.

Other related works

The CoW used the Phase 2 project as an opportunity to rebuild and expand the Jubilee Underpass, which has a history of flooding during heavy rainfalls in the Summer. Storm drains are being upgraded to prevent flooding. The CN Portage Junction Overpass, constructed in 1948 was replaced by a modern structure in 2018.

References

Further reading 

 The Future Development of the Greater Winnipeg Transit System. Norman D. Wilson. March 1959
 Winnipeg Area Transportation Study (WATS): Volume 3 - Projections & Recommendations. Metropolitan Corporation of Greater Winnipeg. September 1968.
The (Non) History of Rapid Transit in Winnipeg. City Magazine. Jeff Lowe. Spring 1985.
Direction to the Future. Winnipeg Transit. 2000.
Rapid Transit Task Force. City of Winnipeg. 2005.
Pembina Highway Underpass Study. City of Winnipeg. 2012.
Southwest Transitway Route Planning. Winnipeg Transit. July 2019.

External links
Winnipeg RT
Stage 2 – Southwest Rapid Transit Corridor Project P3 Business Case Summary
Plenary Roads Winnipeg
Winnipeg Transit
Bus rapid transit in Canada
Busways
2012 establishments in Manitoba